Hockey Club Košice is a Slovak professional ice hockey club based in Košice that competes in the Slovak Extraliga, the top tier of Slovak ice hockey. It is the most successful hockey club in Slovakia and the former Czechoslovakia, having won the Tipos Extraliga eight times, the Czechoslovakian Hockey League twice, the 1st. Slovak National Hockey League once, the IIHF Continental Cup once, the Tatra Cup ten times, and the Rona Cup four times. The club is nicknamed "Oceliari", which means "Steelers" in English.

History

The club was established in Košice in 1962 as an army hockey club called TJ Dukla Košice. At that time, there were two weak regional ice hockey clubs in the city. The new club was much stronger and joined the Czechoslovak Hockey League within two years. In 1966, Dukla changed its name to TJ VSŽ Košice. In 1986, the club became the Ice Hockey Champions of Czechoslovakia for the first time, beating HC Dukla Jihlava in the finals. It won again in 1988, beating HC Sparta Prague. At that time, the club was the second-best ice hockey club in Europe after CSKA Moscow. After Czechoslovakia split into the Czech Republic and Slovakia in 1993, VSŽ Košice became a member of the Slovak Extraliga, which it soon went on to win three times. In 1998, the club changed its name to HC Košice.

On 24 February 2006, Košice left Lokomotíva Košice Stadium and moved to the newly-constructed Steel Aréna. The arena is named in honour of the club's sponsor, U. S. Steel Košice, and is also known as L. Troják Stadium after one of the club's most popular players. Košice won the league for the fourth time by defeating HK 36 Skalica to end the 2008–09 season. A victory over HC Slovan Bratislava at the end of the 2009–10 season saw the club win the league for the second year in a row and the fifth time in total, which it followed up by beating HK Poprad in the finals of the 2010–11 season to secure the league for the third year in a row (the first "hat trick" in the league's history) and the sixth time in total. Košice qualified for the finals for the sixth time in a row at the 2012–13 season, but suffered a loss to HKm Zvolen. A victory over HK Nitra in the finals of the 2013–14 season led Košice to its seventh league victory. The club won its eighth and most recent league during the 2014–15 season, defeating HC '05 Banská Bystrica in the finals.

Honours

Domestic
Slovak Extraliga

  Winners (8): 1994–95, 1995–96, 1998–99, 2008–09, 2009–10, 2010–11, 2013–14, 2014–15
  Runners-up (7): 1993–94, 1996–97, 1997–98, 2002–03, 2007–08, 2011–12, 2012–13
  3rd place (3): 2001–02, 2006–07, 2015–16

Czechoslovak Extraliga
  Winners (2): 1985–86, 1987–88
  Runners-up (1): 1984–85
  3rd place (1): 1988–89

1st. Slovak National Hockey League
  Winners (1): 1963–64

International
IIHF European Cup
  Runners-up (2): 1986–87, 1988–89

IIHF Continental Cup
  Winners (1): 1997–98
  Runners-up (1): 1998–99

IIHF Super Cup
  Runners-up (1): 1998

Pre-season
Tatra Cup
  Winners (10): 1978, 1979, 1982, 1986, 1987, 1988, 1992, 1993, 2008, 2017

Rona Cup
  Winners (4): 1995, 1996, 2009, 2013

Players

Current roster

Notable players

 Ladislav Troják
 Jiří Holeček
 Bedřich Brunclík
 Vincent Lukáč
 Igor Liba
 Jaromír Dragan
 Jiří Bicek
 Ľubomír Vaic
 Marek Svatoš
 Juraj Faith
 Rudolf Huna
 Peter Bartoš
 Martin Štrbák
 Miroslav Zálešák
 Rastislav Staňa
 Ladislav Nagy
 Peter Bondra
 Peter Ihnačák
 Miroslav Ihnačák
 Ján Lašák
 Arne Kroták
 Ivan Droppa
 Jerguš Bača
 Stanislav Gron
 Martin Marinčin
 Tomáš Jurčo
 Ján Laco
 Erik Černák

References

External links
 Official club website
 Steel Arena website

Sport in Košice
Kosice, HC
Kosice, HC
Ice hockey clubs established in 1962
1962 establishments in Czechoslovakia